Kosin or Kosins is both a given name and surname. Notable people with the name include:

 Kosin Hembut (born 1982), Thai footballer
 Phil Kosin (1950–2009), American journalist
 Yuri Kosin (1948–2022), Ukrainian photographer
 Gary Kosins (born 1949), American football player
 Kathy Kosins (born 1954), American singer

Jewish surnames